Kotalipara is an upazila of Gopalganj District in the Division of Dhaka, Bangladesh.

Geography
It has 37,603 households and a total area of 362.05 km2. It is a mofussil town. It is 4–5 hours from Dhaka via highway by bus (Aricha point) and 3 hours from Mawa point.

Notable Personalities

Mahamahopadhyay Haridas Siddhanta Bagish

Sangeetacharya Tarapada Chakraborty

Sukanta Bhattacharya

Jogen Chowdhury 
Dipankar Dipak (Literary-journalist)

Demographics
As of the 1991 Bangladesh census, Kotalipara had a population of 206,195, of whom 102,198 were aged 18 or over. Males constituted 50.48% of the population, and females 49.52%. Kotalipara had an average literacy rate of 34.8% (7+ years), against the national average of 32.4%.

Administration
Kotalipara Upazila is divided into Kotalipara Municipality and 12 union parishads: Amtali, Bandhabari, Ghagar, Hiran, Kalabari, Kandi, Kushla, Pinjuri, Radhaganj, Ramshil, Sadullapur and Suagram. The union parishads are subdivided into 101 mauzas and 208 villages.

Kotalipara Municipality is subdivided into 9 wards and 9 mahallas.

References

Upazilas of Gopalganj District, Bangladesh